Nicolas "Nic" Roeser (8 November 1896 – 27 July 1997) was a Luxembourgian gymnast who competed at the 1928 Summer Olympics where, representing Société de Gymnastique Grund, his best individual finish was joint-32nd (with Ladislav Tikal of Czechoslovakia) in the men's horse vault. He was ranked, alongside his team, 9th among 11 nations in the team all-around. He was born in Pettingen.

References

1896 births
1997 deaths
People from Mersch
Luxembourgian centenarians
Olympic gymnasts of Luxembourg
Gymnasts at the 1928 Summer Olympics
Luxembourgian male artistic gymnasts
Men centenarians
20th-century Luxembourgian people